Joseph Škoda (10 December 1805 – 13 June 1881) was a Czech physician, medical professor and dermatologist. Together with Carl Freiherr von Rokitansky, he was the founder of the Modern Medical School of Vienna.

Life

Škoda was born in Pilsen, Bohemia, as the second son of a locksmith. He attended the gymnasium at Pilsen, entered the University of Vienna in 1825, and received the degree of Doctor of Medicine on 10 July 1831.

He first served in Bohemia as physician during the outbreak of cholera, was assistant physician in the General Hospital of Vienna, 1832–38, in 1839 city physician of Vienna for the poor, and on 13 February 1840, on the recommendation of Dr. Ludwig Freiherr von Türkheim, chairman of the Imperial Committee of Education, was appointed to the unpaid position of chief physician of the department for tuberculosis just opened in the general hospital.

In 1846, thanks to the energetic measures of Carl von Rokitansky, professor of pathological anatomy, he was appointed professor of the medical clinic against the wishes of the rest of the medical faculty. In 1848 he began to lecture in German instead of Latin, being the first professor to do so. On 17 July 1848, he was elected an active member of the mathematico-physical section of the Austrian Academy of Sciences. In Vienna in 1851 Škoda treated Petar II Petrovic Njegos who was suffering from pulmonary consumption, what we call today tuberculosis.

Early in 1871, he retired from his professorship; the occasion was celebrated by the students and the population of Vienna by a great torchlight procession in his honour. He died in Vienna. Rokitansky called him "a light for those who study, a model for those who strive, and a rock for those who despair". Škoda's benevolent disposition is best shown by the fact that, notwithstanding his large income and the known simplicity of his lifestyle, he left a comparatively small fortune, and in his will, bequeathed legacies to a number of benevolent institutions.

Joseph Škoda was an uncle to the industrialist Emil Škoda.

Works

Škoda's great merit lies in his development of the methods of physical investigation for diagnosis in medicine. The discovery of the method of percussion diagnosis made in 1761 by the Viennese physician, Leopold Auenbrugger (1722–1809), had been forgotten, and the knowledge of it was first revived in 1808 by the Frenchman  Jean-Nicolas Corvisart (1755–1821), court physician to Napoleon I. René Laennec (1787–1826) and his pupils Pierre Adolphe Piorry (1794–1879) and Jean-Baptiste Bouillaud (1796–1881) added auscultation to this method. Škoda began his clinical studies in close connexion with pathological anatomy while assistant physician of the hospital, but his superiors failed to understand his course, and in 1837, by way of punishment, transferred him to the ward for the insane, as it was claimed that the patients were annoyed by his investigations, especially by the method of percussion.

His first publication, "Über die Perkussion" (About Percussion) in the "Medizinische Jahrbücher des k.k. österreichen Kaiserstaates", IX (1836), attracted little attention. This paper was followed by: "Über den Herzstoss und die durch die Herzbewegungen verursachten Töne und über die Anwendung der Perkussion bei Untersuchung der Organe des Unterleibes" (About the Percussion of the Heart and the Sounds Originated by Heart Movements, and Its Application to the Investigation of Organs of the Abdomen), in the same periodical, vols XIII, XIV (1837); "Über Abdominaltyphus und dessen Behandlung mit Alumen crudum" (About Abdominal Typhus and Its Treatment with Alumen), also in the same periodical, vol. XV (1838); "Untersuchungsmethode zur Bestimmung des Zustandes des Herzens" (Methods of Investigation of the Conditions of the Heart), vol. XVIII (1839); "Über Pericarditis in pathologisch-anatomischer und diagnostischer Beziehung" (About Pericarditis in Pathological Anatomic and Diagnostic Relationships), XIX (1839); "Über Piorrys Semiotik und Diagnostik" (About Piorry's Semiotic and Diagnostics), vol. XVIII (1839); "Über die Diagnose der Herzklappenfehler" (About the Diagnosis of Defects of Heart Valves), vol. XXI (1840).

His small, but for many years afterwards, unsurpassed chief work, "Abhandlung über die Perkussion und Auskultation" (Vienna, 1839), was repeatedly published and translated into foreign languages and established his universal renown as a diagnostician.

In 1841, after a journey for research to Paris, he made a separate division in his department for skin diseases and thus gave the first impulse towards the reorganization of dermatology by Ferdinand von Hebra. In 1848 at the request of the Ministry of Education he drew up a memorial on the reorganization of medical education, and encouraged later by his advice the founding of the present higher administration of the Medical School of Vienna. As regards therapeutics the accusation was often made against him that he held to the "nihilism" of the Vienna School. As a matter of fact his therapeutics were exceedingly simple in contrast to the great variety of remedial agents used at that time, which he regarded as useless, as in his experience many ailments were cured without medicines, merely by suitable medical supervision and proper diet.

His high sense of duty as a teacher, the large amount of work he performed as a physician, and the early appearance of heart disease are probably the reasons that from 1848 he published less and less. The few papers which he wrote from 1850 are to be found in the transactions of the Academy of Sciences and the periodical of the Society of Physicians of Vienna of which he was the honorary president.

Bibliography
 A Sakula. Joseph Skoda 1805–81: a centenary tribute to a pioneer of thoracic medicine. Thorax, London, June 1981, 36 (6): 404–411.

References

External links

 Joseph Škoda. WhoNamedIt

Sources 

19th-century Czech people
19th-century Austrian people
Czech dermatologists
Austrian dermatologists
University of Vienna alumni
Austrian nobility
Academic staff of the University of Vienna
Physicians from Plzeň
1805 births
1881 deaths